Tui Sabeto (Erenavula na Momo Levu na Tui Sabeto) is the traditional Fijian title of the Paramount Chief of Sabeto or Betoraurau, a 5-minute drive from the north of Nadi International Airport. The Tui Sabeto exercises chiefly authority over the villages of Koroyaca, Narokorokoyawa, Natalau, Naboutini and Korobebe.

From the five villages consists of 7 yavusa (Tribe) namely Conua (headed by the Tui Sabeto), Leiwavuwavu (the Bati Leka, Gonedau), Nasara, Waruta (the Mataisau), Ne (Narogokoso), Leweikoro, Leweidrasa.

Current Title Holder 
The present Tui Sabeto is Ratu Tevita Susu Mataitoga, son of the late Tui Sabeto, Ratu Kaliova Mataitoga who was a Member of the Great Council of Chiefs. The appointment of the Tui Sabeto is now normally carried out by the Mataqali Buasali, not the kingmakers or the Sauturaga as in other traditions.

References

Fijian chiefs